Jamsil Arena, also known as Jamsil Indoor Stadium, is an indoor sporting arena. It is part of Seoul Sports Complex, located in Seoul, South Korea. The capacity of the arena is 11,069 for basketball and was built from December 1976 to April 1979. The Seoul Samsung Thunders are the tenants.

Notable events
Jamsil Arena hosted the basketball events and volleyball final of the 1988 Summer Olympics.

It has also been used to host various entertainment events, to include World Wrestling Entertainment (WWE) events and concerts, by Iron Maiden, Alicia Keys, Mariah Carey, Muse, Nine Inch Nails, Incubus, and Japanese band L'Arc-en-Ciel, among others.

2001
 Westlife: Where Dreams Come True Tour – 31 May 2001
2003
 Mariah Carey: Charmbracelet World Tour - 20 June 2003
2007
 Muse: Black Holes and Revelations Tour – 7 March 2007 (MuseWiki)
2011
 Sting kicked off the Asian leg of his Symphonicities Tour here on January 11, 2011, along with the Royal Philharmonic Orchestra.
 2PM: 2PM "Hands Up" Asia Tour – 2 and 3 September 2011
2012
 Kim Junsu: XIA 1st World Tour Concert – 19 May 2012 
 Wonder Girls: Wonder World Tour – 7 July 2012
2013
 2PM: 2PM Live Tour in Seoul – "What Time Is It" – The Grand Finale – 21 and 22 June 2013
 DSP Media: DSP Festival – 14 December 2013
2014
 23rd Seoul Music Awards – 23 January 2014
 Super Junior: Super Show 6 – 19, 20 and 21 September 2014
 2PM: 2PM World Tour "GO CRAZY!" – 3 and 4 October 2014
2015
 FNC Kingdom in Seoul: F.T. Island, CNBLUE, Juniel, N.Flying, AOA – 2 & 3 May 2015
 Apink: Apink second Concert "Pink Island" – 22 and 23 August 2015
 CNBLUE  2015 CNBLUE LIVE [COME TOGETHER] in Seoul – 24 and 25 October 2015
2016
 BtoB:  2016 BtoB Born to Beat Time Encore – 26 and 27 March 2016
 Wheesung & K.Will:  2016 Wheesung & K.Will Tour [Bromance Show] in Seoul – 30 April 2016
 Seventeen: Like Seventeen "Shining Diamond" Concert – 30 and 31 July 2016
 JYP Nation "MIX & MATCH" 2016 in South Korea: J.Y. Park, Wonder Girls, Jo Kwon, 2PM, Min, Fei, Baek A-yeon, Park Ji-min, Got7, Bernard Park, G.Soul, DAY6, Twice – 6 and 7 August 2016
2017
 26th Seoul Music Awards – 19 January 2017
 Sechs Kies: Yellow Note Final In Seoul – 21 and 22 January 2017
 6th Gaon Chart Music Awards – 22 February 2017
 VIXX: VIXX Live Fantasia – 12, 13 and 14 May 2017
 Highlight: Highlight Live 2017 – Can You Feel It? – 2, 3 and 4 June 2017
 Twice: Twice 1st Tour – Twiceland – The Opening - Encore – 17 and 18 June  2017
 Brian McKnight: SUPERSTAGE Concert with Ailee and Zion.T – 21 June 2017
 Taeyang: White Night World Tour – 26 and 27 August 2017
 With, Antenna: Toy, Jung Jae-hyung, Lucid Fall, Peppertones, Park Sae-byul, Lee Jin-ah, Chai, Jung Seung-hwan, Kwon Jin-ah, Sam Kim – 2 and 3 September
 Taemin: Taemin 1st Solo Concert "OFF-SICK〈on track〉" – 14, 15 October 2017
IU: 2017 IU Tour Concert 〈Palette〉 – 9 and 10 December 2017
 Super Junior: Super Show 7 – 15, 16 and 17 December 2017
 Highlight: Highlight Live 2017 – Celebrate – 21, 22 and 23 December 2017
2018
 7th Gaon Chart Music Awards – 14 February 2018
 Got7: Got7 2018 Eyes On You Tour – 4, 5 and 6 May 2018
 Twice: Twice 2nd Tour – Twiceland Zone 2 – Fantasy Park – 18, 19 and 20 May  2018
 Seventeen: Ideal Cut – 28, 29, 30 June and 1 July
Taeyeon: 's...Taeyeon Concert (2018–2019) – 20 and 21 October 2018
2019
 8th Gaon Chart Music Awards – 23 January 2019
Z-Pop Dream Live in Seoul – 23 February 2019
 2019 LCK Spring Finals – 13 April
 Iz*One: Iz*One 1st Concert "Eyes On Me" in Seoul – 7, 8 and 9 June 2019
 Day6: You Made My Day Ep.2 Scentographer – 29 June 2019
 Day6: World Tour "Gravity" – 9, 10 and 11 August 2019
2020
 9th Gaon Chart Music Awards – 8 January 2020
2021
 NU'EST: "The Black" Concert - 26, 27 and 28 November 2021
2022
 Exo: 2022 Debut Anniversary Fan Event: EXO - 9 April 2022
 Stray Kids: Stray Kids 2nd World Tour "Maniac" - 29, 30 April and 1 May 2022
 Highlight: Highlight Live 2022 [Intro] - 20, 21 and 22 May 2022
 ASTRO: The 3rd ASTROAD 'STARGAZER' - 28, 29 May 2022
 28th SBS Dream Concert - 18 June 2022
 Tomorrow x Together : Tomorrow x Together World Tour "Act: Lovesick" - 2 and 3 July 2022
 Super Junior: Super Show 9: Road - 15, 16 and 17 July 2022
 Ateez: The Fellowship: Break The Wall - 29 and 30 October 2022
 The Boyz: 2022 The Boyz Fan-Con: The B-Road - 2 and 3 December 2022
2023
 aespa: 1st Concert ‘SYNK : Hyper Line’ - 25 and 26 February 2023
 Suga: Agust D Tour - 24 and 25 June 2023

Gallery

See also 
 List of indoor arenas in South Korea
 New Millennium Hall, Konkuk University

References

External links

1988 Summer Olympics official report. Volume 1. Part 1. p. 164.

Indoor arenas in South Korea
Venues of the 1988 Summer Olympics
Olympic basketball venues
Olympic volleyball venues
Sports venues in Seoul
Seoul Samsung Thunders
Basketball venues in South Korea
Volleyball venues in South Korea
Sports venues completed in 1979
Buildings and structures in Songpa District
Judo venues
Taekwondo venues
Venues of the 1986 Asian Games
Asian Games basketball venues